Adolf Henrik Lindstrøm (May 17, 1866 – September 21, 1939) was a Norwegian chef and polar explorer.

Lindstrøm was born in Hammerfest. He was of Kven origin. He took part in Otto Sverdrup's Fram expedition from 1898 to 1902. Later he traveled with Roald Amundsen during his navigation of the Northwest Passage in the Gjøa from 1903 to 1906, and in the South Pole expedition of 1910 to 1912. He also took part in an expedition to Siberia from 1914 to 1916. Lindstrøm died in Oslo.

Lindstrøm was a large, jovial man and he rarely left the ship, unlike other expedition participants. The only thing that could lure him out was the opportunity to hunt ptarmigan because fresh meat was appreciated on the long expeditions. Lindstrøm was also a dispassionate man and an asset to the crew when "polar nerves" got to them and homesickness arose during the long polar night after several years in the ice. Roald Amundsen wrote in his diary on April 5, 1911, "He has rendered greater and more valuable services to the Norwegian polar expedition than any other man."

In 1906, Lindstrøm was named a knight of the Order of St. Olav "for bold nautical achievement." He received the Fram Medal and the South Pole Medal. In 2017 a bronze sculpture of Lindstrøm made by Håkon Anton Fagerås was unveiled in Hammerfest.

References

Norwegian chefs
Kven people
Norwegian polar explorers
People from Hammerfest
1866 births
1939 deaths
Amundsen's South Pole expedition